The 2011 San Diego County Credit Union Poinsettia Bowl, the seventh edition of the game, was a post-season American college football bowl game, held on December 21, 2011 at Snapdragon Stadium in San Diego, California as part of the 2011–12 NCAA Bowl season.

The game was played at 5:00 p.m. PT on ESPN, and featured the Louisiana Tech Bulldogs from the Western Athletic Conference (WAC) versus the TCU Horned Frogs from the Mountain West Conference.

Louisiana Tech accepted a bid to compete in the 2011 edition of the game on November 26, while TCU accepted a bid to compete on December 4.

The TCU Horned Frogs defeated the Louisiana Tech Bulldogs by a final score of 31–24.

Teams

TCU

On December 4, 2011, the TCU Horned Frogs accepted an invite to represent the MWC. The Horned Frogs entered the bowl with a record of 10–2 and were the 2011 Mountain West Conference champions. This marked the third appearance in this bowl game for the Horned Frogs and their seventh straight bowl appearance. TCU came into the game averaging 210.2 yards on the ground.

Louisiana Tech

On November 26, 2011, the Louisiana Tech Bulldogs accepted an invite to represent the WAC. The Bulldogs entered the bowl with a record of 8–4 and were the 2011 WAC champions. The team also entered the game on a 7-game winning streak and were allowing only 122.2 rushing yards per game. This marked the first appearance in a bowl game for Louisiana Tech since the 2008 Independence Bowl.

Game summary
In the 1st half, the Bulldogs out gained TCU 288 yards to 139 yards. However, TCU forced two turnovers to keep it tied 10–10 at the end of the half. Louisiana Tech scored first on a 23-yard field goal from Matt Nelson. TCU tied the game up in the 2nd quarter with a 25-yard field goal from Ross Evans. The Bulldogs responded on their next drive with a 2-yard touchdown pass from Colby Cameron to Quinton Patton to put Louisiana Tech up 10–3. With less than two minutes remaining in the 2nd quarter, Cameron threw an interception that was returned 24 yards to the Louisiana Tech's 25-yard line. Taking advantage of the turnover, the Horned Frogs tied the game 10–10 with 26 seconds left in the 1st half on a 7-yard Ed Wesley touchdown run.

On its first possession of the 3rd quarter, TCU took a 17–10 lead on a 1-yard Matthew Tucker rushing touchdown. On their next possession, Louisiana Tech recovered a TCU muffed punt at TCU's 12-yard line. The Bulldogs took advantage of the turnover and tied the game 17–17 on a 2-yard Hunter Lee touchdown run. After trading punts, TCU's Casey Pachall threw an interception with 3:35 remaining in the 3rd quarter. Colby Cameron capitalized on the interception by throwing a 61-yard touchdown pass to Myles White to give Louisiana Tech a 24–17 lead.

On the next drive, TCU went on an 18 play, 72-yard drive that took 9 minutes and 21 seconds. The drive involved two 4th down conversions and a defensive pass interference call in the end zone on a 3rd-and-goal play to give TCU a 1st down at the 2-yard line. The long drive was capped off with a 1-yard Luke Shivers touchdown run to tie the game 24–24 with 7:49 left in the game. After forcing the Bulldogs to punt, TCU took a 31–24 lead on a 42-yard touchdown pass to Skye Dawson. After forcing Louisiana Tech to punt again with 3:33 left on the clock, TCU was able to close out the game to preserve the victory.

With the win, TCU coach Gary Patterson picked up his 109th victory, tying Dutch Meyer for the most wins in TCU history.

Scoring summary 
Source.

Statistics

References

External links
 ESPN box score

2011–12 NCAA football bowl games
2011
2011
2011
2011 in sports in California
December 2011 sports events in the United States